Elections to North West Leicestershire District Council took place on 4 May 1995, with the previous election having taken place in 1991 and with the next held in 1999. The election took place across all 22 electoral wards and a total of 40 councillors were elected. Labour tightened its grip on the council by capturing nine seats from the Conservatives. Former Conservative rural strongholds such as Appleby, Breedon, Kegworth and Ravenstone fell to Labour, who also came away with all but one seat in Ashby. The result was that Labour held 35, or 87.5% of the seats, the Conservatives were reduced to just three seats and the Liberal Democrats failed to gain any seats.

Results

|}

Ward results
In wards that are represented by more than one councillor, electors were given more than one vote each, hence the voter turnout may not match the number of votes cast.

References

1995
1995 English local elections
1990s in Leicestershire